The North Water Viaduct is a disused railway viaduct located north of Montrose, Scotland. It was built by the Montrose and Bervie Railway and crosses the River North Esk. It has eleven spans. It is located adjacent to the older Lower North Water Bridge which carries the A92 road.

The railway opened in 1865. It closed to passenger services in 1951 and to freight in 1966. In 1986, British Rail applied for permission to demolish the viaduct, but was refused. In 1996, it was announced that a grant from Historic Scotland would be available for refurbishing the viaduct.

The viaduct now forms part of the National Cycle Network. It is Category B listed.

References 

Viaducts in Scotland
Category B listed buildings in Aberdeenshire
Category B listed buildings in Angus, Scotland